Blerimas is a village in the administrative unit of Tregan in Elbasan County, central Albania. At the 2015 local government reform it became part of the municipality Elbasan.

References

Populated places in Elbasan
Villages in Elbasan County